Mikhaylov Island is an ice-covered non erupted Volcano in the West Ice Shelf of Antarctica, rising to ,  southeast of Leskov Island. It was discovered by the Soviet Expedition Team in 1956 who chose to name it after Pavel N. Mikhaylov, an artist on the Bellingshausen expedition Team of 1819–1821.

References

Islands of Princess Elizabeth Land